San Giuseppe al Trionfale is a 20th-century minor basilica and titular church in Rome, located immediately north of the Vatican, dedicated to Saint Joseph.

History 

San Giuseppe in Via Trionfale was built in 1909–12, designed in Neoclassical style by Aristide Leonori. It was the project of Luigi Guanella, founder of the Servants of Charity.

On 7 June 1967, it was made a titular church to be held by a cardinal-deacon. In 1970 it was made a minor basilica.

Cardinal-Deacons
Egidio Vagnozzi (1967–1980); promoted to cardinal-priest in 1973; is buried in the basilica
Giuseppe Casoria (1983–2001); promoted to cardinal-priest in 1993
Severino Poletto (2001–2022); created a cardinal-priest

Structure

The basilica has a central nave with side aisles with nine bays. The facade is rendered in peach, with architectural details in white, and dado in limestone.

The interior is in a Baroque style, with Corinthian columns in pinkish-grey Baveno granite with gilded capitals. Stained glass windows depict Pope Pius IX, Pope Pius X and Pope Benedict XV. Mosaics in the apse were added in 1964 to designs by Pio and Silvio Eroli, with scenes from the life of Saint Joseph. The spandrel of the triumphal arch shows Christ in majesty with scenes featuring the four patriarchs Abraham, Isaac, Jacob and Joseph, son of Jacob. Silvio Consadori added twelve frescos in 1971.

References

External links

Archived version of official site 

Titular churches
Roman Catholic churches completed in 1912
20th-century Roman Catholic church buildings in Italy
Rome Q. XIV Trionfale
Saint Joseph
Neoclassical church buildings in Italy